The 2001 Challenge Bell was a tennis tournament played on indoor carpet courts at the Club Avantage Multi-Sports in Quebec City in Canada that was part of Tier III of the 2001 WTA Tour. It was the 9th edition of the Challenge Bell, and was held from September 17 through September 23, 2001. Meghann Shaughnessy won the singles title.

Champions

Singles

 Meghann Shaughnessy def.  Iva Majoli, 6–1, 6–3
It was Shaughnessy's only title of the year and the 2nd of her career.

Doubles

 Samantha Reeves /  Adriana Serra Zanetti def.  Klára Koukalová /  Alena Vašková, 7–5, 4–6, 6–3
It was Reeves' only title of the year and the 1st of her career. It was Zanetti's only title of the year and the 1st of her career.

External links
Official website

Challenge Bell
Tournoi de Québec
Challenge Bell
2000s in Quebec City